Events from the year 1946 in the United Kingdom.

Incumbents
 Monarch – George VI
 Prime Minister – Clement Attlee (Labour)
 Parliament – 38th

Events

 1 January
 The first international flight from London Heathrow Airport, to Buenos Aires.
 Atomic Energy Research Establishment established at Harwell, near Oxford.
 4 January – Theodore Schurch is hanged at HM Prison Pentonville by Albert Pierrepoint, the only British soldier executed for treachery committed during World War II and the last person to be executed in Britain for an offence other than murder.
 10 January – first United Nations General Assembly convenes at Methodist Central Hall Westminster.
 17 January – the United Nations Security Council holds its first meeting at Church House in London.
 14 February – the Bank of England is nationalised.
 15 February – American dance craze, the Jitterbug, sweeps Britain.
 20 February – Royal Opera House in Covent Garden re-opens after the War with The Royal Ballet (relocated from Sadler's Wells Theatre) performing The Sleeping Beauty.
 5 March – Winston Churchill delivers his "Iron Curtain" speech at Westminster College in Fulton, Missouri, United States.
 9 March – Burnden Park disaster: A stadium disaster at Bolton Wanderers F.C.'s Burnden Park in Bolton kills 33 and injures hundreds.
 10 March – British troops begin withdrawal from Lebanon.
 15 March – Labour Prime Minister Clement Attlee announces that Britain is granting India's wish for independence. On 24 March, the 1946 Cabinet Mission to India arrives in New Delhi for discussions.
 22 March – the Treaty of London grants the British protectorate of the Emirate of Transjordan its independence.
 24 March – BBC Home Service radio broadcasts Alistair Cooke's first American Letter. As Letter from America, this programme will continue until a few weeks before Cooke's death in 2004.
 27 April – 1946 FA Cup Final: the first postwar FA Cup final is won by Derby County, who beat Charlton Athletic 4–1 at Wembley Stadium.
 4 May – first-class cricket returns, having been suspended during the War.
 20 May – the House of Commons votes through the Coal Industry Nationalisation Act 1946 to nationalise British coal mines.
 23 May – Terence Rattigan's drama The Winslow Boy premieres in London.
 31 May – London Heathrow Airport opened fully for civilian use.
 1 June – television licence introduced.
 7 June – television broadcasting by the BBC, suspended during World War II, resumes.
 8 June – a victory parade is held in London to celebrate the end of World War II.
 27 June – Government imposes bread rationing.
 July – homeless families squat in a former Army camp at Scunthorpe.
 August – Arthur Horner, a member of the Communist Party, becomes General Secretary of the National Union of Mineworkers.
 1 August
 Finance Act receives Royal Assent, including the establishment of the National Land Fund to secure culturally significant property for the nation as a memorial to the dead of World War II.
 Atomic Energy Act of 1946 in the United States ends co-operation between the U.K. and U.S. on development of nuclear technology.
 6 August
 Family allowance introduced, a cash benefit paid to mothers.
 Free milk ( pint daily) provided in UK state schools to all pupils under the age of 18.
 9 August – Arts Council incorporated by Royal Charter.
 31 August – league football returns, having been suspended during World War II.
 September–November – Britain Can Make It exhibition at the Victoria and Albert Museum in London, promoted by the Council of Industrial Design and the Board of Trade to show off good domestic and industrial design.
 8 September – mass squat by homeless families of the Ivanhoe Hotel and other empty properties in London organised by the Communist Party.
 15 September – Marshal of the Royal Air Force Sir Arthur Harris, Commander-in-Chief of RAF Bomber Command, retires.
 16 September – popular quiz show Have A Go! with Wilfred Pickles first broadcast nationally on BBC Radio.
 29 September – BBC Third Programme begins broadcasting.
 1 October – English premiere of J. B. Priestley's drama An Inspector Calls at the New Theatre, London, starring Ralph Richardson.
 7 October – the BBC Light Programme transmits the first episode of the daily radio magazine programme Woman's Hour (initially presented by Alan Ivimey), which will still be running more than 70 years later, and of the daily adventure serial Dick Barton – Special Agent.
 10 October – first community arts centre opened, at Bridgwater in Somerset.
 1 November – first Royal Command Performance at a public cinema, the Empire, Leicester Square: premiere of the Powell and Pressburger film A Matter of Life and Death starring David Niven.
 9 November – shooting of Margaret Cook in Carnaby Street, London.
 10 November – Peter Scott opens the Slimbridge Wetland Reserve in Gloucestershire.
 11 November – Stevenage, a village in Hertfordshire, is designated by the Attlee government as Britain's first new town to relieve overcrowding and replace bombed homes in London. The new town is set to have around 60,000 residents once it is completed, and the first homes are expected to be ready by 1952 and the town fully developed by the early 1960s. The town's centerpiece will be a revolutionary pedestrianised central shopping area.
 17 November – Eight British Army servicemen are killed in Jerusalem by Jewish terrorists.
 22 November – Tony Benn is elected as Treasurer of the Oxford Union.
 29 November
 Premiere of educational documentary film The Instruments of the Orchestra containing Benjamin Britten's composition The Young Person's Guide to the Orchestra (concert premiere 15 October conducted by Malcolm Sargent with the Royal Liverpool Philharmonic in the Philharmonic Hall, Liverpool).
 BBC Television premieres Pinwright's Progress, the world's first regular half-hour situation comedy.
 26 December – David Lean's film of Great Expectations, based on the Charles Dickens novel, and featuring John Mills, Valerie Hobson, Martita Hunt, Alec Guinness, Francis L. Sullivan, Jean Simmons, and Finlay Currie, is released to great acclaim.

Undated
 Cinemagoing reaches an all-time peak, with 1,635 million admissions during the year.
 Lifting of prohibition on married women working in the Civil Service.
 Fred Pontin opens the first Pontins holiday camp, at Brean Sands, Burnham-on-Sea, Somerset.
 The University of Bristol establishes the first university drama department in the UK.
 Bush DAC90 bakelite radio introduced: it becomes the best-selling model for some years.

Publications
 January – launch of Penguin Classics under the editorship of E. V. Rieu, whose translation of the Odyssey is the first published in the series and will be the country's best-selling book over the next decade.
 W. V. Awdry's children's book Thomas the Tank Engine, first in The Railway Series.
 Enid Blyton's girl school story First Term at Malory Towers, first in the Malory Towers series.
 Agatha Christie's Hercule Poirot novel The Hollow.
 R. G. Collingwood's collected philosophical lectures The Idea of History (posthumous).
 John Stewart Collis' memoir While Following the Plough.
 Stella Gibbons' novel Westwood.
 Philip Larkin's novel Jill.
 George Mikes' book How to be an Alien.
 Mervyn Peake's novel Titus Groan, first in the Gormenghast series.
 Thomas Sharp's book The Anatomy of the Village.
 Joint Committee of the Building Research Board and the Fire Offices' Committee's first report on fire safety General Principles and Structural Precautions.

Births

January – February
 3 January – John Paul Jones, English bassist (Led Zeppelin)
 6 January – Syd Barrett, English guitarist and singer (Pink Floyd) (died 2006)
 7 January – Mike Wilds, English racing driver and pilot
 14 January – Harold Shipman, serial killer (died 2004)
 19 January – Julian Barnes, novelist
 25 January – Pete Price, Merseyside radio disc jockey
 28 January – David Duckham, rugby union player (died 2023)
 1 February – Elisabeth Sladen, television actress (died 2011)
 7 February
 Brian Patten, Liverpool poet
 Pete Postlethwaite, actor (died 2011)
 9 February – Seán Neeson, Alliance Party of Northern Ireland politician
 11 February – Malcolm Walker, English businessman
 13 February – Colin Matthews, composer
 15 February – Clare Short, politician
 16 February – Ian Lavender, actor
 20 February – Brenda Blethyn, English actress
 21 February – Alan Rickman, English actor (died 2016)
 26 February – Colin Bell, footballer (died 2021)
 28 February – Robin Cook, Labour politician (died 2005)

March – April
 1 March – Tony Ashton, rock pianist and music producer (died 2001)
 6 March – David Gilmour, English musician (Pink Floyd)
 21 March – Timothy Dalton, actor
 22 March – Richard Faulkner, Baron Faulkner of Worcester, journalist and politician
 25 March – Cliff Balsam, English footballer
 27 March – Patrick Richardson, travel writer and author
 2 April – Sue Townsend, English comic novelist and playwright (died 2014)
 4 April – Dave Hill, English guitarist (Slade)
 9 April 
Les Gray, English vocalist (Mud) (died 2004)
Mike Hancock, politician
Alan Knott, English cricketer
Sara Parkin, Scottish activist and politician
 12 April – George Robertson, Scottish politician
 15 April – Hugh Laddie, judge (died 2008)
 19 April – Tim Curry, actor, voice artist, singer and composer
 21 April – Alan Rickman, actor (died 2016)
 24 April – Piers Gough, architect
 25 April – John Fox, statistician
 27 April – Nicholas Serota, art curator
 28 April – Linda Knowles, high jumper
 29 April – Humphrey Carpenter, children's writer and broadcaster (died 2005)

May – June
 1 May – Joanna Lumley, actress
 4 May – John Watson, Northern Irish racing driver
 10 May
 Donovan, Scottish musician
 Maureen Lipman, actress, columnist and comedian
 Dave Mason, English rock singer-songwriter and guitarist (Traffic)
 11 May – David Varney, English civil servant
 13 May – Tim Pigott-Smith, English actor (died 2017)
 16 May – Robert Fripp, English rock guitarist
 19 May – Trevor Adams, actor (died 2000)
 20 May – Paul Hirst, English sociologist (died 2003)
 22 May – George Best, Northern Irish footballer (died 2005)
 23 May – Stephen Marks, English businessman
 1 June – Brian Cox, Scottish actor
 2 June – Peter Sutcliffe, English serial killer (died 2020)
 11 June – Jenny Pitman, English horse trainer and author
 14 June – Ernie Graham, Northern Irish singer-songwriter (died 2001)
 15 June – Noddy Holder, English rock singer-songwriter (Slade)
 19 June – Michael Jay, Baron Jay of Ewelme, English politician and diplomat, British Ambassador to France
 20 June – Nigel Kalton, mathematician and academic (died 2010)
 21 June – Kate Hoey, politician
 23 June – Kathy Wilkes, English philosopher (died 2003)
 25 June 
 Buzz Goodbody, English theatre director (died 1975)
 Ian McDonald, musician (died 2022)
 28 June – Jamie Cann, politician (died 2001)

July – August
 5 July – Gwyneth Powell, British actress (died 2022)
 9 July – Mitch Mitchell, English drummer (died 2008)
 3 August – Jack Straw, British politician
 6 August 
 Ron Davies, politician
 Allan Holdsworth, guitarist and composer (died 2017)
 15 August – William Waldegrave, Baron Waldegrave of North Hill, academic and politician, Chancellor of the Duchy of Lancaster
 23 August – Keith Moon, English drummer (The Who) (died 1978)
 26 August – Alison Steadman, actress
 27 August – Peter Tobin, serial killer (died 2022)

September – October
 1 September – Barry Gibb, pop singer-songwriter
 9 September – Adrian Smith, statistician, President of the Royal Society
 10 September – Don Powell, English drummer
 11 September 
 Mike Bull, Northern Irish pole vaulter and decathlete
 Anthony Browne, English author and illustrator
 John Roberts, Welsh footballer and manager (d. 2016)
 Jim Shoulder, English footballer and manager
 12 September – Neil Lyndon, journalist and author
 19 September
 Michael Elphick, actor (died 2002)
 Oliver Foot, actor (died 2008)
 25 September – Felicity Kendal, English actress
 28 September – Tom Bower, writer and journalist
  8 October – Bel Mooney, English author, journalist, advice columnist
 10 October
 Charles Dance, actor
 Chris Tarrant, TV and Radio Presenter
 13 October – Edwina Currie, British Conservative politician, author and radio personality
 14 October
Justin Hayward, English singer and songwriter (Moody Blues)
Katy Manning, English-Australian actress and production manager
 17 October – Vicki Hodge, English actress
 19 October – Philip Pullman, English author
 22 October – Eileen Gordon, British Labour politician
 29 October – Peter Green, blues rock guitarist and singer-songwriter (died 2020)
 31 October
 Caroline Jackson, British politician
 Stephen Rea, Northern Irish actor

November – December
 1 November – Ric Grech, British bassist (Family, Blind Faith, Traffic (died 1990))
 5 November – Ken Whaley, Austrian-English bass player and songwriter (d. 2013)
 6 November – Susie Orbach, English psychotherapist
 7 November  – Martin Barre, English musician (Jethro Tull)
 12 November – P. P. Arnold, born Patricia Ann Cole, American-born soul singer
 14 November – Carola Dunn, English writer
 18 November 
 Andrea Allan, Scottish actress
 Chris Rainbow, Scottish singer-songwriter and producer (died 2015)
 21 November – Marina Warner, English writer
 22 November – Brian Cookman, English musician and composer (died 2005)
 23 November – Diana Quick, English actress
 4 December – Angela Browning, English Conservative politician and MP for Tiverton and Honiton
 14 December 
 Jane Birkin, English actress and singer
 Peter Lorimer, Scottish footballer (died 2021)
 16 December – Trevor Pinnock, English harpsichordist and conductor
 20 December – Lesley Judd, English actress and television presenter
 25 December – Christopher Frayling, English cultural historian
 27 December
 Janet Street Porter, English broadcast journalist
 Polly Toynbee, English journalist and writer
 29 December – Marianne Faithfull, English singer and actress
 31 December – Roy Porter, medical historian (died 2002)

Deaths
 2 January
 Eleanor Rathbone, social campaigner and politician (born 1872)
 Will Thorne, trade unionist and politician (born 1857)
 3 January – William Joyce, Irish American fascist propagandist (born 1906) (hanged at Wandsworth Prison for treason)
 4 January – Theodore Schurch, British-born soldier and collaborator (born 1918) (hanged at Pentonville Prison for treachery)
 23 January –  Sir Frank MacKinnon, judge (born 1871)
 5 February – George Arliss, English film actor (born 1868)
 8 March – Frederick W. Lanchester, automotive engineer (born 1868)
 3 April – Alf Common, English footballer (born 1880)
 21 April – John Maynard Keynes, economist (born 1883)
 9 May – Connie Gilchrist, Countess of Orkney, child actress and model (born 1865)
 25 May – Ernest Rhys, writer (born 1859)
 26 May 
 Sir Francis Lacey, cricket administrator (born 1859)
 Arthur Winnington-Ingram, Bishop of London (born 1858)
 14 June – John Logie Baird, Scottish-born television pioneer (born 1888)
 11 July – Paul Nash, artist (born 1889)
 15 July – Razor Smith, English cricketer (born 1877)
 23 July – James Maxton, Scottish socialist, leader of the Independent Labour Party (born 1885)
 13 August – H. G. Wells, English novelist (born 1866)
 16 August – Sir Granville Bantock, classical composer and conductor (born 1868)
 31 August – Harley Granville-Barker, actor, playwright and critic (born 1877)
 16 September – Sir James Jeans, physicist, astronomer and mathematician (born 1877)
 2 November – John Barrett, Roman Catholic bishop (born 1878)
 18 November – Donald Meek, actor (born 1878)
 17 December – Constance Garnett, translator (born 1861)

See also
 List of British films of 1946
The Winter of 1946–47 in the U.K.

References

 
Years of the 20th century in the United Kingdom